Kochholz is a settlement in the municipality of Dunkelsteinerwald in Melk District, Lower Austria in northeastern Austria.

References

Populated places in Lower Austria